The 2016 PlayStation Fiesta Bowl (December) was a college football bowl game that was played on December 31, 2016 at the University of Phoenix Stadium in Glendale, Arizona.  This 46th Fiesta Bowl Game was a College Football Playoff semifinal with the winner of the game competing against the winner of the 2016 Peach Bowl (Alabama) in the 2017 College Football Playoff National Championship which took place at Raymond James Stadium in Tampa, Florida. It was one of the 2016–17 bowl games that concluded the 2016 FBS football season.

It was the second game to be called "the 2016 Fiesta Bowl", as the previous season's game was played on January 1, 2016. Ironically, the previous season's game featured Ohio State. The previous two Fiesta Bowls were also played in the same calendar year as each other. The game's title sponsor was  Sony Interactive Entertainment via its PlayStation brand as part of a multi-year deal with broadcasting and marketing rightsholder ESPN, which includes branded content and making PlayStation the official video gaming and virtual reality sponsor of the College Football Playoff. The winning team received the Molina Fiesta Bowl Trophy.

Clemson became just the second team in college football history to shut out Ohio State (11-2) in a bowl game, joining Cal in the 1921 Rose Bowl.  The game also marked the first time that Buckeyes head coach Urban Meyer was shut out in his career, in about 193 games, and his second major loss to Dabo Swinney in the past four seasons.  The game also marked the second consecutive advance to the CFP National Championship game by the Clemson football program.

Teams
On Sunday December 4, 2016, the CFP Semifinals was announced with #2 Clemson vs. #3 Ohio State playing in the Fiesta Bowl.

This was the third meeting between the schools, with Clemson having won both of the previous matchups.  The most recent meeting was the 2014 Orange Bowl, where the Tigers defeated the Buckeyes by a score of 40–35.

Game summary

Scoring summary

Statistics

See also
2019 Fiesta Bowl (December) - Also a CFP Semifinal featuring Clemson and Ohio State, won by Clemson
2021 Sugar Bowl - Also a CFP Semifinal featuring Clemson and Ohio State, featured Ohio State's first win overall

References

2016–17 NCAA football bowl games
Fiesta Bowl
2016–17 College Football Playoff
2016 Fiesta Bowl
2016 Fiesta Bowl
December 2016 sports events in the United States
2016 in sports in Arizona